The Belarusian Telegraph Agency or BelTA (БелТА) is the state-owned national news agency of the Republic of Belarus. It operates in Russian, Belarusian, English, German, Spanish and Chinese languages. Since 2018, the director of BELTA is Irina Akulovich.

History

The agency was founded on December 23, 1918. During the Soviet times BelTA cooperated with the Telegraph Agency of the Soviet Union (TASS), although it was legally independent of it.

After the USSR ceased to exist in 1991, BelTA has been the national news agency of Belarus. It transmits over a hundred daily reports, and provides information to other news agencies of Commonwealth of Independent States members about the activities of Belarusian officials and organizations in and out of the country.

BelTA has offices in all regions of Belarus, as well as abroad. The main office is in Minsk.

Criticism 
Some observers called BeTA a propaganda outlet. 

The BelTA Director-General Dzmitry Zhuk was banned from entering the European Union between 2011 and 2016 as part of the EU's sanctions against Belarus following what the EU describes as a crackdown of opposition protests after the 2010 presidential election. According to the EU Council's decision concerning restrictive measures against Belarus following the 2010 election, Dzmitry Zhuk is responsible for "relaying state propaganda in the media, which has supported and justified the repression of the democratic opposition and of civil society on December 19, 2010 using falsified information."

See also
 Propaganda in Belarus
Media of Belarus
Eastern Bloc media and propaganda

References

External links
BelTA: About Our Company

Eastern Bloc mass media
Organizations established in 1918
News agencies based in Belarus
Mass media in Minsk
Propaganda in Belarus
1922 establishments in Belarus
Belarusian news websites